Berislav is a Slavic masculine given name derived from beri - "he/she carries" and slava - "glory,  fame". Feminine form is Berislava. Another spelling is Berisav.

The following notable people have this name:

 Berislav Rončević - Bosnian Croat politician

The following places have names that derive from the name:

 Berislavec - village in Zagreb County
 Berislăvești - commune in Vâlcea County, Romania
 Beryslav - city in Kherson Oblast of southern Ukraine.

The Berislavić medieval Croatian noble family was named after a Berislav.

See also
 Slavic names

Slavic masculine given names
Bosnian masculine given names
Bulgarian masculine given names
Croatian masculine given names
Macedonian masculine given names
Montenegrin masculine given names

Serbian masculine given names
Slovene masculine given names
Ukrainian masculine given names